Vladyslav Babohlo (born 14 November 1998) is a Ukrainian and Moldavian football player. He plays for Oleksandriya.

Club career
He made his Ukrainian Premier League debut for FC Oleksandriya on 17 February 2018 in a game against FC Stal Kamianske.

References

External links
 
 

1998 births
Living people
People from Gagauzia
Ukrainian footballers
Ukraine youth international footballers
Ukraine under-21 international footballers
Moldovan footballers
Association football defenders
FC Chornomorets Odesa players
FC Oleksandriya players
Ukrainian Premier League players
Ukrainian people of Moldovan descent